Uzma Beg is a Pakistani actress, television presenter and Radio host. She is active in the industry since last decade and has played supporting roles in several television series. She played the comic role of Naik Bakht “Bakhto” in Chupke Chupke which earned her better recognition. In 2022, she made her cinematic debut with Ehteshamuddin's Dum Mastam.

Life and career 
Born in Lahore, Pakistan, Beg has lived in Paris, London, Melbourne, Sydney and Dubai. She wanted to become and actor since her childhood however, a career in TV and films was frowned upon by her parents and she was never allowed to perform in front of the camera. She was however able to pursue acting after marriage.

She started acting in 2015 and first played a supporting role in Momina Duraid's soap Ishq-e-Benaam. She received little praise by portraying a frustrated wife and mother in social drama Bisaat e Dil, and supportive and timid eldest daughter-in-law of a haveli in pre-partition romance Aangan. In 2021, she appeared as supporting actor in Hum TV's Ramadan special Chupke Chupke (TV series). The series was written by Saima Akram Chaudhry and directed by Danish Nawaz in which Beg played the character of Naik Bakht “Bakhto”, a Siraki wife of a Nawab who fights at every occasion with the other wife Nawab Sahab and was praised for her performance and character.

Filmography

Film 
 Dum Mastam (2022)

Television

Web series

References 

Living people
Pakistani women television presenters
21st-century Pakistani actresses
Pakistani television actresses
Pakistani radio presenters
Pakistani women radio presenters
Pakistani radio personalities
Actresses from Lahore
Year of birth missing (living people)